Mir Khavand may refer to:

Mir Khavand-e Olya
Mir Khavand-e Sofla

See also
 Mir Khvand the historian